İsmail Ogan (5 March 1933 – 26 April 2022) was a Turkish freestyle wrestler and coach. He competed at the 1960 and 1964 Olympics and won a silver and a gold medal, respectively. He also collected three medals at the world championships between 1957 and 1963.

Wrestling career
İsmail Ogan came from the province (Elmalı) of Antalya on Turkey's southern Mediterranean coast. After Turkish yağlı güreş (oil wrestling) style, which he started with, he switched to Olympic wrestling at the age of 17, after he was discovered by Yaşar Doğu. It did not take long for him to attract the attention of the leading men in the Turkish wrestling federation by performing very well in the national arena. He was included in the national freestyle wrestling team and received perhaps the best Turkish wrestling coaches of the time in Yaşar Doğu and Celal Atik. He appeared on the international wrestling mat in 1957, wrestling very successfully in five world championships and winning three medals. European championships were not held at that time. In his own country, he had three tough rivals in İbrahim Zengin, Nuro Ayvar and Mahmut Atalay, against whom he had to prove himself time and again. At the 1960 Olympics in Rome, he won the silver medal, beaten only by U.S. wonderboy Douglas Blubaugh, the only opponent to whom he conceded only a points victory. Four years later at the Tokyo Olympics he was again convincing and became Olympic champion in the welterweight division.

After the 1964 Olympics, İsmail Ogan ended his career as an active wrestler and went back to live in Antalya, and then worked as a wrestling coach.

İsmail Ogan was taken to Serik State Hospital after an illness on April 9 and then transferred to Akdeniz University Hospital. İsmail Ogan, who was diagnosed with respiratory failure and multiple organ problems, died 26 April 2022.

References

External links
 

1933 births
2022 deaths
Sportspeople from Antalya
Wrestlers at the 1960 Summer Olympics
Wrestlers at the 1964 Summer Olympics
Turkish male sport wrestlers
Olympic silver medalists for Turkey
Olympic gold medalists for Turkey
Olympic medalists in wrestling
Medalists at the 1964 Summer Olympics
Medalists at the 1960 Summer Olympics 
Deaths from multiple organ failure
20th-century Turkish people
21st-century Turkish people